Parliamentary elections were held in the Moldavian SSR in February and March 1990 to elect the 380 members of the Supreme Soviet. They were the first and only free elections to the Supreme Soviet of the MSSR, and although the Communist Party of Moldova was the only registered party allowed to contest the election, opposition candidates were allowed to run as independents. Together with affiliated groups, the Popular Front of Moldova won a landslide victory. Candidates who were openly supporters of the Popular Front won about 27% of seats; together with moderate Communists, mainly from rural districts, they commanded a majority.

On 5 June the Supreme Soviet renamed the Moldavian SSR the "Soviet Socialist Republic of Moldova" and issued a Declaration of Sovereignty on 23 June. It subsequently removed references to socialism and soviets on 23 May 1991 by adopting the name "Republic of Moldova", and declared full independence from the Soviet Union on 27 August 1991. The next legislature was elected as the Parliament of Moldova in 1994.

Results
All 380 deputies were elected in uninominal constituencies. The first sitting of the parliament was held on April 17, 1990.

Elected MPs

 Andrei Baştovoi
 Anatol Salaru
 Victor Pavlic
 Ilie Mocanu
 Vasile Gudima
 Andrei Ţurcanu
 Mihai Poita
 Nicolae Robu
 Vasile Nedelciuc
 Alexandru Mosanu
 Ion Popa
 Constantin Culea
 Gheorghe Carlan
 Mihai Sâromatnicov
 Valeriu Cibotaru
 Valentin Mândâcanu
 Titu Serghei
 Pavel Lupăcescu
 Mihai Bejan
 Dumitru Guţu
 Jorj Crisico
 Mihai Străjescu
 Vitalie Ustroi
 Dumitru Cereş
 Anatol Ivanov
 Peter Soltan
 Alexandru Gorodnicenco
 Iurie Maxuta
 Vladimir Dobrea
 Nicolae Grosu
 Nicolae Alexei
 Ion Eremia
 Dumitru Braşoveanu
 Elisei Secrieru
 Vlad Pascaru
 Teodor Macrinici
 Vasile Pruteanu
 Dumitru Cernei
 Nicolae Domente
 Gheorghe Bogdanov
 Iurie Timoshenco
 Vasile Basoc
 Ion Borsevici
 Anton Spanu
 Tudor Lefter
 Andrei Munteanu
 Gheorghe Siumbeli
 Gheorghe Nechit
 Dumitru Holban
 Grigore Cusnir
 Gheorghe Răducan
 Fiodor Nirean
 Sergiu Fandofan
 Ion Tacu
 Mihai Scutaru
 Mihai Ciorici
 Ilarion Guidea
 Ion Scutaru
 Mihai Lazar
 Nicolae Misail
 Ion Tanas (Chisinau)
 Vasile Para
 Valeriu Jardan
 Alexandru Ohotnicov
 Valentin Colun
 Semion Guranda
 Sergiu Argatu
 Vasile Şova
 Victor Reabcici
 Valentin Nicolaenco
 Ion Negură
 Nicolae Stadinciuc
 Tudor Mogăldea
 Nicolae Malachi
 Vasile Vartic
 Nicolae Todos
 Alexandru Arseni
 Mihai Cotorobai
 Spiridon Martâniuc
 Dumitru Grosu
 Nicolae Moraru
 Mihai Druţă
 Vasile Şevcenco
 Gheorghe Amihalachioaie
 Evgheni Berdnikov
 Yuri Atamanenko
 Ion Rusu
 Ludmila Laşcionova
 Pavel Gusac
 Dumitru Moţpan
 Vasile Domente
 Danil Matcin
 Mihai Popovici
 Ion Ciuntu
 Valentin Krilov
 Vladimir Solonari
 Anatol Rusanov
 Ion Novac
 Ion Mărgineanu
 Aurel Saulea
 Ananie Badan
 Valerian Gherman
 Afanasie Chechiu
 Ion Madan
 Lidia Istrati
 Elena Balan
 Olga Ojoga
 Dumitru Noroc
 Ion Prisăcaru
 Ion Stepanenco
 Valeriu Lebedev
 Victor Tocan
 Nicolae Proca
 Constantin Bogdan
 Ion Butnaru
 Ion Neagu
 Gheorghe Beliciuc
 Dumitru Postovan
 Stepan Plaţinda
 Ion Chiriac
 Petru Tărâţă
 Vladimir Carauş
 Grigore Cuşmăunsă
 Ion Palii
 Călin Botica
 Valeriu Obreja
 Sergei Popa
 Gavril Frangu
 Mihai Rusu
 Sergiu Manea
 Ion Ţurcan
 Anatol Zelenschi
 Ludmila Scalnâi
 Anatol Saragov
 Eugen Popusoi
 Grigore Bordeianu
 Anatol Chiriac
 Ilia Trombiţki
 Vladimir Agachi
 Piotr Şornikov
 Vitalie Zavgorodni
 Gheorghe Hioară
 Victor Berlinschi
 Anatol Ivanov
 Vasile Nestor
 Sergiu Coşceev
 Marin Beleuţă
 Valentin Dolganiuc
 Petru Poita
 Gheorghe Slabu
 Dumitru Postovan
 Ion Lapaci
 Victor Puşcaş
 Ion Buga
 Pantelei Pârvan
 Alecu Renita
 Iacob Negru
 Ion Popov
 Petru Lucinschi
 Constantin Tănase
 Gheorghe Trestianu
 Valentin Lefter
 Mihai Dimitriu
 Petru Muntean
 Ion Ungureanu
 Ion Cojocaru
 Valeriu Serjant
 Gheorghe Mazilu (-2004)
 Vasile Ursachi
 Iovu Bivol
 Petru Griciuc
 Andrei Cubasov
 Vasile Costov
 Constantin Sahanovschi
 Sergiu Chircă
 Petru Chimirciuc
 Alexandru Buruian
 Zosim Bodiu
 Mihai Musumanschi
 Svetlana Mâsliţcaia
 Mihai Plasiciuc
 Andrei Cabac
 Nicolae Dabija
 Tudor Olaru
 Anton Terente
 Petru Caterev
 Ion Munteanu
 Semion Gurghis
 Ştefan Maimescu
 Gheorghe Scutaru
 Vladimir Gudumac
 Serafim Urecheanu
 Tudor Angheli
 Vladimir Iuzvenco
 Victor Morev
 Vitalie Pritula
 Andrei Diaconu
 Constantin Ţurcan
 Fiodor Carapunarl
 Constantin Capsamun
 Constantin Tauşanji
 Dumitru Puntea
 Ion Batcu
 Stepan Curoglo
 Grigore Bratunov
 Alexandru Snegur
 Pavel Dubălari
 Stepan Curtev
 Vasile Cojocaru
 Valeriu Bulgari
 Nadejda Brânzan
 Anatol Conoplin
 Vasile Iovv
 Vladimir Capanji
 Boris Aculov
 Ghimn Pologov
 Grigore Volovoi
 Mihail Catcov
 Larisa Pokotilova
 Mihai Coscodan
 Gheorghe Grosu
 Nicolae Andronatii
 Nicolae Andronic
 Victor Arestov
 Vasile Baboi
 Semion Badrajan
 Pavel Bejenuţă
 Anatol Belitcenco
 Vladimir Beşleaga
 Tudor Bobescu
 Stepan Bogacenco
 Nicolai Bogdanov
 Anatoly Bolsakov
 Vladimir Bondarenco
 Ilie Bratu
 Petru Braşoveanu
 Boris Briziţchi
 Peter Bodorin
 Aleksandr Bulîcev
 Valentin Burduja
 Alexandru But
 Boris Carandiuc
 Petru Carauş
 Nadejda Cegurco
 Valdemar Cirt
 Valentin Cicikin
 Vitalie Ciorap
 Gheorghe Ciorba
 Mihail Kendighelean
 Gheorghe Ciobanu
 Ivan Cior
 Anatol Chişner
 Mihail Codin
 Vladlen Colesov
 Anatol Coleghin
 Victor Constantinov
 Ion Costaş
 Nicolae Costin
 Ilie Cosanu
 Dumitru Cretu
 Dumitru Croitor
 Valentin Cunev
 Anatol Davadov
 Valeriu Daraban
 Vladimir Darii
 Chiril Darmancev
 Lidia Dicusar
 Victor Diucarev
 Mircea Druc
 Alexandru Efanov
 Gheorghe Efros
 Valeriu Egorov
 Vladimir Emilianov
 Grigore Evstratii
 Fiodor Evdodiev
 Mihai Gajiu
 Iurie Gherasimov
 Gheorghe Ghimpu
 Mihai Ghimpu
 Vitalie Glebov
 Vladimir Goncear
 Mihai Goncearenco
 Vasile Graf
 Ion Grigoraş
 Gheorghe Gusac
 Mihai Guslikov
 Ion Guţu
 Ion Hadârcă
 Grigore Jelihovski
 Vladimir Labunski
 Valentin Leşinski
 Anatol Liseţki
 Veaceslav Litvinenco
 Vladlen Liuurov
 Ion Luca
 Petru Lupaşcu
 Mihai Malai
 Andrei Manoilov
 Fiodor Marinov
 Valeriu Matei
 Emil Mazureac
 Ion Mereuţă
 Ion Miţcul
 Andrei Moraru
 Alexandru Morozov
 Vasile Năstase
 Petru Nastasiuc
 Tudor Negru
 Victor Nikulin
 Constantin Novoderejkin
 Valentin Oglindă
 Nicolae Oleinic
 Velor Ordine
 Nicolae Ostapenco
 Tudor Panţâru
 Vasile Pasaniuc
 Piotr Pascari
 Ion Pădureţ
 Ion Palancica
 Boris Pălărie
 Dumitru Pălărie
 Mihai Patras
 Eugen Pâslaru
 Sava Platon
 Anatol Plugaru
 Valentina Podgornaia
 Petru Poian
 Mihai Popovici
 Anatol Popuşoi
 Veniamin Potaşev
 Evgheni Puşneac
 Alexandra Raiu
 Vladimir Rîleakov
 Nicolai Riumin
 Andrei Rusnac
 Mircea Rusu
 Andrei Safonov
 Vasile Sajin
 Anatol Salamandîk
 Petru Sandulachi
 Ludmila Silicenko
 Anatol Simac
 Igor Smirnov
 Mircea Snegur
 Mihai Şabarcin
 Vasile Şoimaru
 Constantin Tampiza
 Ion Tăbâică
 Dumitru Todoroi
 Stepan Topal
 Anatol Țăranu
 Pavel Ţîmai
 Ivan Ţînnik
 Tudor Ţopa
 Anatol Ţurcanu
 Leonid Ţurcan
 Anatol Ţurcanu
 Ion Ţurcanu
 Victor Uncuţă
 Ion Ungureanu
 Vasile Ursu
 Andrei Vartic
 Ignat Vasilachi
 Ion Vatamanu
 Vasile Vatamanu
 Vasile Vodă
 Piotr Volkov
 Anna Volkova
 Mihai Volontir
 Mihai Voloşin
 Piotr Zalojkov
 Oleg Zapoliski
 Iuri Zinoviev
 Fiodor Zlatov
 Vitali Znagovan

Aftermath
The Popular Front of Moldova gained complete control once Gagauz and Transnistrian deputies walked out in protest over Romanian-oriented cultural reforms. One leader of the Popular Front of Moldova, Mircea Druc, formed the new government. The Popular Front saw its government as a purely transitional ministry; its role was to dissolve the Moldavian SSR and join Romania.

References

 

1990 elections in the Moldavian Soviet Socialist Republic
Parliamentary elections in Moldova
Election and referendum articles with incomplete results